David Mendlen is an American technologist and executive. Mendlen is a General Manager at Microsoft and is the Executive Producer of the Decoded Show. He earlier served as the speechwriter for Microsoft co-founder Bill Gates and former CEO Steve Ballmer and, among other assignments, wrote Gates’ last speech and Ballmer’s first as CEO. Mendlen has keynoted conferences including DEVintersection. Mendlen has contributed articles to The Next Web.

Career
In 1998 Mendlen joined Microsoft as Lead Product Manager for Visual Studio.NET. Subsequently he served as Senior Director of Windows Product Management. Today Mendlen is the General Manager of Microsoft's Developer Experience (DX) division, focusing on securing the future of the platform by building a rich third-party application ecosystem. The Developer Experience team is intended to be the company's public face among the techie set.

Decoded Show
In 2016, Mendlen introduced as Executive Producer the Decoded Show, with Microsoft Technical Fellow John Shewchuk as Host. The show offers regular insight into developer focused topics with interesting people from the industry. The Decoded Show has hosted speakers including actor Kevin Hart

References 

American technology executives
Year of birth missing (living people)
Living people